Ptilomacra is a genus of moths in the family Cossidae.

Species
 Ptilomacra senex Walker, 1855

References

External links
Natural History Museum Lepidoptera generic names catalog

Cossidae genera